Rayane Bounida (3 March 2006) is a Belgian-Moroccan footballer with Anderlecht who will turn professional with Dutch team AFC Ajax. He has been touted as the next big thing since 2014, despite not having played a professional game yet. At the time of his 16th birthday, he had a contract with Nike and more than 420,000 followers on Instagram.

Bounida played with the youth teams of Anderlecht, and regularly was featured in international media as the new big talent from a very young age. On his sixteenth birthday it was announced that he would sign a professional contract with Dutch team Ajax, for a rumoured €700,000 per year. Many major European teams were interested in signing the young player, including Manchester City and Paris Saint-Germain.

Bounida has also played for the Belgian U16 team, scoring 4 goals in 11 games.

Notes

Living people
2006 births
Belgian footballers
R.S.C. Anderlecht players
AFC Ajax players